Saarbrücken Hauptbahnhof or Saarbrücken Central Station also called  Eurobahnhof Saarbrucken, is the principal railway station in the German city of Saarbrücken and the largest station in the Saarland, a German state on the border with France. Around 10 million passengers use the station annually. The station is operated by DB Station&Service as a category 2 station, served by regional and long-distance trains.

History 
Saarbrücken's central station was opened on 16 November 1852 as St Johann-Saarbrücken. The present city of Saarbrücken emerged later from the amalgamation of (old)Saarbrücken, St Johann, Malstatt and St. Arnual. The station was on the Saarbrücken railway, which ran from Bexbach via Neunkirchen (Saar) and Stieringen to the French Eastern Railway. The 56 metre long, 13.50 metre wide sandstone building was between the two tracks with access by an underpass, there being, unusually for that time, no track crossing.

As the railway facilities continued to grow, so the station building was also enlarged. In 1891/1893 a station entrance building with two striking towers was erected in front of the tunnel, and in 1908 there were plans to build a completely new station building. This was to begin in 1914, but the outbreak of the First World War put paid to the plans. In 1932, Saarbrücken handled 453 daily arrivals and departures, of which 51 were express trains, the second-largest number of trains on the Reichsbahn, after Leipzig. After the reannexation of the Saarland in 1935, plans for a new station restarted in earnest. This was to be completed by 1941, but again the war prevented them coming to fruition.

In the Second World War 80% of the railway facilities in Saarbrücken were destroyed. Of the entrance building only the two towers remained, and other buildings like the locomotive shed (Bahnbetriebswerk) were totally destroyed. In the station yard there was not a single through track left. Under US direction, today's track 19 was provisionally restored. Over this track the US troops ran their supply trains towards Neunkirchen-Bexbach-Homburg under their own management and running on sight.

The two towers of the entrance building were linked in 1952 by a flat-roofed building and this formed a temporary structure for many years thereafter. In the 1960s fresh plans were made for a new reception and administrative building. The first sod was turned on 27 June 1963 by the Mayor of Saarbrücken, Fritz Schuster, and the President of the Bundesbahn railway division, Alois Meyer. In the same year the remains of the old entrance building were removed. In September 1967 the new 120-metre-long, 26-metre-high building was inaugurated. On the two-storey-high ground floor were the main hall, luggage check-in, shops and a restaurant; on the upper floors of the seven-storey building were the computer centre, medical services, offices and staff canteen.

In February 1960 electric train services began on the Forbach-Homburg.

In 1977 work on a thorough modernisation was begun. Amongst other things the platforms were raised to a height of 760 mm. In order to create space for more through tracks, the first station building from 1852, the so-called 'island building', was demolished between 18 September 1978 and March 1979.

Saarbrücken 21 

The Eurobahnhof (or Eurostation) is the name for the Saarbrücken 21 project to modernise the station. The existing station and surrounding land was rebuilt. In June 2007 an important milestone during the work was passed with the opening of the Paris-Eastern France-Southern Germany (POS) high-speed route, with its branches to Stuttgart and Frankfurt, the latter from Saarbrücken.

Key changes included a new southern façade for the station building, a newly designed entrance hall and pedestrian underpass, new lifts and a new access to the station from the north from the district of Rodenhof. The costs of about €31 million were divided between the state capital of Saarbrücken, the Saarland and Deutsche Bahn AG.

The extensive network of tracks north of the station was largely removed; east of the station tracks were relaid in a different layout and modernised. New train maintenance and storage facilities were constructed within a relatively compact space. The area freed up is intended to be used for car parking and a new industrial estate, the "Eurostation Estate" or Quartier Eurobahnhof. The construction of access roads to the site and attracting business are proving to be  protracted processes, and will take a long time yet. The large Servicepoint (tickets and catering) set up by DB AG at the north entrance was closed after a short time due to lack of customers.

The first sod was turned on 5 May 2006 and the official opening ceremony of the modernised station took place on 15 December 2007. A year later, however, the station was still not ready; containerised shops and building materials cluttered the station forecourt, and rats were also frequently seen there, much to the consternation of the local population and passengers.

Reception hall/ city entrance 

Now that it has become a Eurostation, Saarbrücken Hauptbahnhof opens onto the city and the pedestrian zone (Reichsstraße/Bahnhofstraße) via a large reception hall. This has rows of shops on two floors which sell everyday fare and popular goods. The shops include a supermarket, fast-food restaurant, newsagents and stationers, tobacconists, florists and more), the DB Service Point, the DB/Ameropa travel centre and a terminal with DB ticket machines.

In front of the city entrance is the large station forecourt, mostly traffic-free, numerous bicycle stands and the four-track Hauptbahnhof tram stop of the Saarbrücken Stadtbahn (Saarbahn), from which run 290 services per day to France/Kleinblittersdorf/Südstadt/Innenstadt and Riegelsberg/Nordstadt. Hundreds of town and regional buses also stop here.

Pedestrian tunnel / Lower level 
All 16 platforms are accessible via the fully renovated pedestrian tunnel and via the Osttunnel. This is about 100 metres long and climbs gently from the City entrance hall to the new North entrance in the district of Rodenhof, and is decorated in plain blue and white shades of colour.

All the platforms are barrier-free and apart from platforms 1-3 are each accessible by lift, escalator and stairs; platforms 1-3 are accessible by staircase and lift.

North terminal / Rodenhof north exit 

Together with the renovation and rebuilding work as part of the Saarbrücken 21 (Eurobahnhof) project, the pedestrian tunnel, which previously ended at platform  16, and to about 2001 at platform 22, was extended into the district of Rodenhof. There a new entrance was built, the North Terminal, which connects to a new Park & Ride area with several hundred spaces; a direct connexion to the Ludwigsbergkreisel and from there to the A 1, A 620 and A 623 motorways is planned. If required the DB-Servicepoint may be opened again.

Platforms 

The platforms (apart from the tram lines in front of the City entrance) are about 20 metres above the pedestrian tunnel that links the two station entrances. The tracks are numbered 1–16, of which only ten are used for passenger trains; these are numbers 1–3, 5–6, 8, 11–12, 14 and 16. The other tracks are for other railway operations or no longer exist. Amongst the ten tracks used for passenger services are six through tracks, that are used by trains passing through Saarbrücken, and four bay platforms (2, 6, 8, 11), at which train services begin or terminate.

Reference projects 

 Frankfurt 21
 Stuttgart 21

Traffic connexions

Long-distance services 

Since December 2007 Saarbrücken Hbf has been on the German high-speed railway network and an arrival and departure gateway for the cross-border ICE trains between Paris and Frankfurt. In addition, long-distance trains run to Dresden, Stuttgart and Salzburg.

Local services 

Saarbrücken Hauptbahnhof is the main hub for regional railway services in the Saarland. With few exceptions, Saarland local services begin and terminate at Saarbrücken Hbf.

Stadtbahn services 

The Saarbahn Stadtbahn lines of the Saarbrücken transport company Saarbahn GmbH run from the four tram platforms on the station forecourt

Trams run every 7.5 minutes on the inner city line between Brebach and Siedlerheim in both directions, every 15 minutes to Kleinblittersdorf and Riegelsberg-Süd and every 30 minutes to Sarreguemines.

Sources 
 Ankunft Saarbrücken Hbf, (150 Jahre Eisenbahn an der Saar), Herausg. Staatskanzlei, Saarbrücken 2002,

See also
List of railway stations in the Saarland

References

External links 
 Detailed article on the European Business Network
 Project page of the GIU (Gesellschaft für Innovation und Unternehmensförderung)
 Eurostation estate (Quartier Eurobahnhof)

Hauptbahnhof
Railway stations in the Saarland
Railway stations in Germany opened in 1852
1852 establishments in Prussia